Beacon Theatre: Live from New York  is the fifth live album by the American blues rock musician Joe Bonamassa. The album was recorded across two nights on November 4 and 5, 2011 at the Beacon Theatre in New York and released by J&R Adventures on DVD on March 8, 2012, and later on CD on September 24, 2012.

Track listing
Disc one

Disc two

Personnel

Musicians
 Joe Bonamassa – guitar, vocals
 Tal Bergman – percussion
 Rick Melick – keyboards
 Carmine Rojas – bass guitar

Guest musicians
 Beth Hart – vocals
 John Hiatt – vocals, acoustic guitar
 Paul Rodgers – vocals

Production personnel
 Erin Cook – public relations
 Warren Cracknell – production manager
 Justin Duguid – lighting design
 Clancy Fraser – tour manager
 Dennis Friel – photography
 Christie Goodwin – photography
 Mike Hickey – guitar technician
 Thomas Jeffries – drum technician
 Michael Jensen – public relations
 Jared Kvitka – engineer
 Colin Moody – bass technician, keyboard technician, stage manager
 Peter Noble – public relations
 Neil O'Brien – booking
 Eric Roa – pro-tools, system engineer
 Pete Sangha – booking
 Kevin Shirley – mixing, photography, producer
 Jonathan Smith – monitor engineer
 Will Taylor – public relations
 Roy Weisman – executive producer
 Mark Weiss – photography
 David Wexler – photography
 Leon Zervos – mastering

Charts

Weekly charts

References 

Albums produced by Kevin Shirley
Joe Bonamassa albums
2012 live albums